The VCS 3 (or VCS3; an initialism for Voltage Controlled Studio, version #3) is a portable analog synthesizer with a flexible modular voice architecture introduced by Electronic Music Studios (London) Limited (EMS) in 1969.

EMS released the product under various names. Logos printed at the console's front left (see photos) say "V.C.S. 3" on the most widely sold version; "The Putney (VCS 3)" on the earlier version; and "The Synthi (VCS 3) II" on the later version (Synthi VCS 3 II).

History
The VCS 3 was created in 1969 by Peter Zinovieff's EMS company. The electronics were designed largely by David Cockerell, and its distinctive appearance was the work of electronic composer Tristram Cary. It was one of the first portable commercially available synthesizers, in the sense that it was housed entirely in a small wooden case, unlike synths from American manufacturers such as Moog Music, ARP and Buchla, which had large cabinets and could take up entire rooms.

The VCS 3 cost just under £330 in 1969. Some people found it unsatisfactory as a melodic instrument due to its inherent tuning instability. This arose from the instrument's reliance on the then-current method of exponential conversion of voltage to oscillator frequency—an approach that other companies also implemented with fewer tuning issues. However, the VCS 3 was renowned as an extremely powerful generator of electronic effects and processor of external sounds for its cost.

The first album recorded using only the VCS 3 was The Unusual Classical Synthesizer on Westminster Gold.

The VCS3 was popular among progressive rock bands, and was used on recordings by Franco Battiato, The Moody Blues, The Alan Parsons Project, Jean-Michel Jarre, Todd Rundgren, Hawkwind, Curved Air, Brian Eno (with Roxy Music and as a solo artist or collaborator), King Crimson, The Who, Gong, and Pink Floyd, and many others. The VCS3-generated bass sound at the beginning of Pink Floyd's "Welcome to the Machine" forms the foundation of the song, with its other parts heard in response. Two VCS3's and a Sequencer 256 were featured in the 1978 film 'The Shout'.

Description

The VCS3 has three oscillators (the first two normal voltage-controlled oscillators; the third a low-frequency oscillator), a noise generator, two input amplifiers, a ring modulator, 24 dB/octave low-pass voltage-controlled filter, a trapezoid envelope generator, a joystick controller, a voltage-controlled spring reverb unit, and two stereo output amplifiers. Unlike most modular synthesiser systems, which used cables to link components, the VCS 3 uses a distinctive patchboard matrix where pins are inserted to connect its components.

Keyboards controller

Although the VCS 3 is often used for generating sound effects due to lack of a built-in keyboard, external keyboard controllers were available for melodic play. The DK1, produced in 1969, is an early velocity-sensitive monophonic keyboard for VCS 3 with an extra VCO and VCA. In 1972 it was extended for duophonic play as DK2.  Also in 1972, the Synthi AKS was released, as well as a digital sequencer with a touch-sensitive flat keyboard, the KS sequencer, and its mechanical keyboard version, DKS.

Related models
The VCS 3's basic design was reused by EMS in many other of their own products, most notably the EMS Synthi 100 (1971), the Synthi A (1971), and AKS (1972, essentially a VCS 3 in a plastic briefcase). The AKS also has a sequencer built into the keyboard's lid.

A former agent of EMS in the United States, Ionic Industries in Morristown, New Jersey, released a portable-keyboard VCS 3 clone in 1973. The Ionic Performer, whose circuitry is based on the VCS 3's, replaced the patchboard matrix with over 100 push-buttons, and added a built-in keyboard and effects units.

Synthi A

The EMS Synthi A has the same electronics as the VCS 3, but was rehoused in a Spartanite briefcase. Instead of routing signals using patch cables, like Moog products, it uses a patch matrix with resistive pins. The 2700 ohm resistors soldered inside each pin vary in tolerance, indicated by different colours: red pins have 1% tolerance, white have 5%, and green pins are attenuating pins with a resistance of 68,000 ohms.

The later Synthi AKS incorporated an early digital 256 event KS (Keyboard Sequencer) sequencer in the lid, with input provided by a capacitance-sensitive Buchla-style keyboard.

Perhaps its most prominent use is in  the introduction to The Alan Parsons Project's I Robot. (1977). VCS 3 synthesisers were also used alongside a traditional chamber music ensemble for the soundtrack to the BBC's Life On Earth nature documentary series, composed by Edward Williams.

Along with Klaus Schulze and Tangerine Dream, other frequent users of the instrument include Cabaret Voltaire, Tim Blake & Miquette Giraudy of Gong, Richard Pinhas of Heldon, Merzbow, Thomas Lehn, Cor Fuhler and Alva Noto.

Development
The original VCS No.1 was a hand-built rack-mount unit with two oscillators, one filter and one envelope, designed by Cockerell before the formation of EMS. When a benefactor, Don Banks, asked Zinovieff for a synthesiser, Zinovieff and Cockerell decided to work together on an instrument that was small and portable but powerful and flexible.

Notable users

 Brian Eno
 Howie B on U2's Pop
 Pink Floyd on Obscured by Clouds (1972), Dark Side of the Moon (1973), and Wish You Were Here (1975)
 Tangerine Dream

Note

References

Bibliography
 
 
 
 

Models

Further reading

External links
Official
http://emssynthesisers.co.uk/
 

Articles
 

modification and resources
 
 

Software emulation
  — A VST simulation of a VCS3/VCS4 with Synthi Sequencer, and Vocoder 5000 by XILS-lab
  — A (commercial) VST simulation of a VCS3/Synthi A by EMS Rehberg
  — A free VST based on the architecture of VCS3/Synthi A by Ninecows

  — Official EMS iOS emulator by apeSoft, with preface by Peter Zinovieff

EMS Synthi A

 (last updated 2013-12-14)
 — A commercial VST simulation of a Synthi A by German EMS

A freeware VST simulation of a Synthi A

The EMS SYNTHI BLOG

EMS synthesizers
Monophonic synthesizers
Electronic musical instruments